Family Scriptures is the debut studio album by American hip hop collective Mo Thugs. It was released on November 5, 1996 via Mo Thugs/Relativity Records. Recording sessions took place at Private Island Trax in Los Angeles. Production was handled by Krayzie Bone, who also served as executive producer together with Layzie Bone, Archie Blaine, Bobby Jones and Paul "Tombstone" O'Neil, with co-producers Gates and Sin. It features contributions from Flesh-n-Bone, II Tru, Ken Dawg, Krayzie Bone, Layzie Bone, Poetic Hustla'z, Souljah Boy, The Graveyard Shift, and Tré.

The album peaked at number two on the Billboard 200 and the Top R&B/Hip-Hop Albums in the United States. On January 3, 1997, it received Platinum certification status by the Recording Industry Association of America for selling 1,000,000 copies.

Its sequel, Mo Thugs Family Scriptures Chapter II: Family Reunion, was released on May 26, 1998.

Controversy
On April 28, 2011, former Bone Thugs-n-Harmony/Mo Thugs associate Roland Brown filed the lawsuit in the Cuyahoga County Court of Common Pleas in Cuyahoga County, Ohio for breach of contract over unpaid royalties, claiming he wrote “Take Your Time” and “Here With Me” by Tré. Naming Mo Thugs Records, Loud Records, Relativity Records, Ruthless Records, Sony Music and Warner Music Group as defendants, Brown was seeking for $27 million ($24 million in damages and $3 million in mechanical royalties for the single, music video, and Family Scriptures album).

Track listing

Sample credits
Track 5 contains elements from "Moments in Love" written by Anne Dudley, Gary Langan, Jonathan Jeczalik, Paul Morley and Trevor Horn and performed by Art of Noise
Track 8 contains elements from "May the Force Be with You" written by George Clinton, William Collins and Gary Lee Cooper and performed by Bootsy's Rubber Band
Track 9 contains replayed elements from "Devotion" written by Philip Bailey and Maurice White and performed by Earth, Wind & Fire
Track 11 contains elements from "Ain't Nothing I Can Do" written by Leo Graham, Paul Richmond and Darryl Ellis and performed by Tyrone Davis
Track 14 contains elements from "I Feel Like Loving You Today" written by Isaac Hayes and performed by Donald Byrd

Personnel

Anthony Henderson – performer (tracks: 1, 5, 7, 9, 12, 15, 16), producer (tracks: 2, 4, 5, 10, 12, 16), co-producer (track 13), executive producer
Kimberly Cromartie – performer (tracks: 1, 7, 9, 10, 16)
Niko Williams – performer (tracks: 1, 7, 9, 10, 16)
Rebecca Forsha – performer (tracks: 1, 7, 9, 10, 16)
Ronald Poole – performer (tracks: 2, 12, 16)
Anthony Chappell – performer (tracks: 2, 16)
Richard Drake – performer (tracks: 2, 16)
Belinda Wallace – performer (tracks: 3, 8, 12, 14, 16)
Cabrina Wilson – performer (tracks: 3, 8, 14, 16)
Steven Howse – performer (tracks: 3, 9, 16), executive producer
Paul O'Neil – performer (tracks: 4, 12, 13, 16), keyboards & producer (track 15), co-producer (track 13)
Actavius Mills – performer (tracks: 4, 13, 16), co-producer (track 13)
Arran Baldwin – performer (tracks: 4, 13, 16), co-producer (track 13)
Kendon Anthony – performer (tracks: 6, 8, 9, 11, 16)
Willy Lyons – performer (tracks: 9, 15, 16)
Stanley Howse – performer (tracks: 13, 16)
Bobby Jones – keyboards (tracks: 2, 4, 5, 7, 9, 12, 13, 15, 16), producer (tracks: 7, 9, 13), co-producer (tracks: 4, 10, 15, 16), mixing & recording (tracks: 2, 4, 5, 7, 9, 10, 12, 13, 15, 16)
Jimmy Zavala – saxophone (track 3)
Romeo Antonio – guitar (tracks: 4, 7, 9, 16)
David Sewell – guitar (track 13)
Archie Blaine – producer, mixing & recording (tracks: 3, 6, 8, 11, 14)
Jeff Shirley – mixing (tracks: 2-4, 6, 8, 11, 13, 14), recording (tracks: 3, 5-8, 10, 11, 14-16)
Brian K. Nutter – recording (track 2)
Furman Smith – recording (track 4)
John Wydrycs – mixing (tracks: 5, 7, 9, 12, 15, 16)
Eric Fahlborg – recording (track 9)
Paul Real – assistant engineering (track 9)
Mark "V" Myers – mixing & recording (track 10)
Jason Mackey – recording (track 12)
Jessie Stewart – recording (track 13), assistant engineering (tracks: 4, 12)
Nate Carpenter – assistant engineering (track 13)
David Bett – art direction
Patrick Aquintey – art direction
Josh Nichols – cover
Christian Lantry – photography
Steve Lobel – A&R

Charts

Weekly charts

Year-end charts

Certifications

References

External links

Mo Thugs albums
1996 debut albums
Relativity Records albums